4 Eylül Dam (September 4 Dam) is a dam in Sivas Province, Turkey, built between 1996 and 2002. The dam creates a lake which is 5.6 km ².

See also
List of dams and reservoirs in Turkey

External links
  DSI

Dams in Sivas Province
Dams completed in 2002
2002 establishments in Turkey